Rukhsana Noor (1959 – 12 January 2017) was a Pakistani journalist, poet and script-writer.

She completed her master in Mass Communications from the University of the Punjab where she later joined as a teacher.

Works
She was known for the following notable works:
 Aa Pyar Dil Mein Jaga 
 Ilham

References

1959 births
2017 deaths
Urdu-language poets from Pakistan
Pakistani women journalists
Pakistani women poets
University of the Punjab alumni
Academic staff of the University of the Punjab
20th-century Pakistani women writers
20th-century Pakistani poets
21st-century Pakistani women writers
21st-century Pakistani poets